KKTM Government College, is a general degree college located in Kodungallur, Thrissur district, Kerala. It was established in the year 1965. The college is affiliated with Calicut University. This college offers different courses in arts and science.

Departments

Science
Physics
Chemistry
Mathematics
Computer Science
Statistics
Botany
Zoology
MCA

Arts
Malayalam
English
Hindi
History
Political Science
Economics
Sanskrit

Accreditation
The college is  recognized by the University Grants Commission (UGC).

Gallery

References

External links

http://www.govtkktmcollege.ac.in

Universities and colleges in Thrissur district
Educational institutions established in 1965
1965 establishments in Kerala
Arts and Science colleges in Kerala
Colleges affiliated with the University of Calicut